The Centrals Football Club was an Australian rules football club in 1891.

They spent just one season as a senior club in the Western Australian Football Association, winning 2 and drawing 1 of 12 matches to finish fourth in a five team competition.

References

Australian rules football clubs in Western Australia
Former West Australian Football League clubs